The Chicago Research and Trading Group was a futures and options trading firm.  It was founded in 1977, by Joe Ritchie and was bought out by NationsBank in 1993.

References

Financial services companies of the United States
Companies established in 1997